Fall of Bari may refer to:

Siege of Bari (870–871), when the Aghlabid-held city fell to the Franks
Siege of Bari (1068–1071), when the Byzantine-held city fell to the Normans